Edward Aburrow is the name of:

 Edward Aburrow senior, mid-18th-century English cricketer
 Edward "Curry" Aburrow (1747–1835), English cricketer who played for the Hambledon Club

See also 

 Aburrow (surname)